Stan Talley (born September 5, 1958) is a former American football punter. He played for the Oakland Invaders from 1983 to 1985 and for the Los Angeles Raiders in 1987.

References

1958 births
Living people
American football punters
TCU Horned Frogs football players
Oakland Invaders players
Los Angeles Raiders players